João Vitor Xavier de Almeida (born 2 March 2000), commonly known as Xavier, is a Brazilian footballer who currently plays as a midfielder.

Club career
Born in Mococa, São Paulo, Xavier joined Ponte Preta's youth setup in 2017, from Portuguesa Santista. He made his first team debut for Ponte on 6 March 2018, starting in a 0–1 Campeonato Paulista home loss against Bragantino.

On 21 January 2019, Xavier joined Corinthians on a four-year contract. He made his debut for the club on 17 September of the following year, starting in a 3–2 home win against Bahia for the Série A championship.

Career statistics

References

External links
Corinthians profile 

2000 births
Living people
Footballers from São Paulo (state)
Brazilian footballers
Association football midfielders
Campeonato Brasileiro Série A players
Associação Atlética Ponte Preta players
Sport Club Corinthians Paulista players
People from Mococa